New Rubyology (Xin Ru Zhu Yi) is an album by Ruby Lin. It was the first album by independent music studio Feile. Lin returned to music after a further four-year break. One of the album's singles, "Beside me", was the theme song for China National Music Radio's "Attention for Poor Children and Students" campaign.

Track listing
我以为没有看到就好 If only I haven't seen  
洋葱浓汤 Onion Soup
 谜底 Answers to the riddle
 习惯了 Used to It
 左右 Beside me
 最好是 The best
 Martini
 海洋 Oceans
 姊妹淘万岁
 一个人浪漫 One person's romance

Awards and nominations
12th M-Zone Music Awards
Won: Golden Melody Song of the Year
Won: All-round Artist

Top Chinese Music Chart Awards
Nominated : Best Female Artist (Taiwan)

Trivia
 People related the songs on this album about lost love to Lin's breakup with former rumored boyfriend Stanley Tong; Lin said the songs are not about anyone in particular.
 The title song, "Onion Soup", ranked in the first position on Chinese Music Charts for three weeks.

External links
Sina music page
QQ official page
Taiwan Kiss Radio page

References

2008 albums
Ruby Lin albums